KKWS (105.9 FM "Superstation K106") is a radio station that broadcasts a country music format. Licensed to Wadena, Minnesota, United States, it serves central and northern Minnesota. The station is owned and operated by Hubbard Broadcasting, Inc.

KKWS is located at 201½ South Jefferson Street, in Wadena, along with sister stations KWAD and KNSP.

Hubbard Broadcasting announced on November 13, 2014 that it would purchase the Omni Broadcasting stations, including KKWS. The sale was completed on February 27, 2015, at a purchase price of $8 million for the 16 stations and one translator.

References

External links 
 SuperStation K106 official website
 

Country radio stations in the United States
Otter Tail County, Minnesota
Radio stations in Minnesota
Wadena County, Minnesota
Radio stations established in 1992
Hubbard Broadcasting